Wales and Borders was a train operating company in the United Kingdom owned by National Express that operated the Wales & Borders franchise from October 2001 until December 2003.

History
In October 1996, the Valley Lines franchise commenced operating services around Cardiff and the South Wales Valleys. In March 2000, the Strategic Rail Authority decided to re-organise the Valley Lines and Wales & West franchises, both being operated by National Express.

Valley Lines became Wales & Borders from October 2001, combining its services with most of Wales & West's Welsh services and the Cambrian Line services from Central Trains. In September 2003 Wales & Borders took over the North Wales Coast Line services from First North Western.

Services
Wales and Borders operated passenger services in Wales and the West Country as seen in their route map. It also operated services to Liverpool Lime Street, Manchester Piccadilly, Birmingham International, Penzance and London Waterloo.

On 14 October 2001, the services from Birmingham New Street to Chester, Aberystwyth, and Pwllheli operated by Central Trains were transferred.

On 28 September 2003, the services from Birmingham New Street, Crewe and Manchester Piccadilly to Llandudno and Holyhead as well as those between Bidston and Wrexham Central and Llandudno and Blaenau Ffestiniog operated by First North Western were also transferred.

Rolling stock
Wales and Borders inherited a fleet of Class 142, Class 143 and Class 150s from Valley Lines and Class 158s from Wales & West and Central Trains. From First North Western it inherited Class 153 and Class 175s.

Wales and Borders also used Mark 2 carriages on Rhymney Line and Fishguard Harbour services hauled by English Welsh & Scottish EWS Class 37s and Mark 2 carriages hauled by English Welsh & Scottish Class 47s on North Wales Coast Line services.

Depot
Wales and Borders' fleet was maintained at Cardiff Canton depot.

Demise
On 1 August 2003, the Strategic Rail Authority awarded the new franchise to Arriva with the services operated by Wales & Borders transferring to Arriva Trains Wales on 7 December 2003.

References 

|-

|-

Defunct train operating companies
National Express companies
Railway companies established in 2001
Railway companies disestablished in 2003
Rail transport in Wales
2001 establishments in Wales
2003 disestablishments in Wales